The Jidoștița is a small left tributary of the river Danube in Romania. It flows into the Danube in Gura Văii.

References

Rivers of Romania
Rivers of Mehedinți County